Reality Check is an Australian television panel discussion program focusing on reality television which debuted on ABC1 on 13 August 2014. The program is hosted by Tom Ballard with a panel of three guests who are industry experts, behind the scenes producers, judges or former contestants to reflect on their experiences. It is produced by Cordell Jigsaw Zapruder, who also produced panel show The Gruen Transfer, which dissected the advertising industry.

Episodes

References

External links
Reality Check website

Australian non-fiction television series
Australian Broadcasting Corporation original programming
Television shows set in New South Wales
2014 Australian television series debuts
English-language television shows